The 2024 Winter Youth Olympics, officially known as the IV Winter Youth Olympic Games  and commonly known as Gangwon 2024, are an upcoming youth winter multi-sport event scheduled to be held between 19 January and 2 February 2024 in Gangwon Province, South Korea. 

The IOC's Future Host Commission named Gangwom as its preferred candidate for the Games, and entered into targeted dialogue with the region under the new Olympic bid process. Their hosting was ratified at the 135th IOC Session in Lausanne, Switzerland, on 10 January 2020. The events will be hosted at sites in Gangneung and Pyeongchang County, which previously hosted the 2018 Winter Olympics in Pyeongchang. They will be the first Winter Youth Olympics held outside of Europe and the third overall Youth Olympics to be held in Asia after 2010 in Singapore and 2014 in Nanjing, China as well as the first Youth Olympics to be celebrated in South Korea.

Bidding process

Gangwon was the only preferred host while Brașov, Granada, and Sofia were interested parties. They took part in the continuous dialogue with the IOC and the Future Host Commission. Gangwon was officially awarded the Games at the 135th IOC Session in Lausanne, Switzerland, on 10 January 2020; all of the requirements were fulfilled to the satisfaction of the commission and the executive board.

Development and preparation

Venues

Much of the venues of the 2018 Winter Olympics will be used for these Games; most of the outdoor snow events will be held in the county of Pyeongchang, while the indoor ice events will be held in the nearby city of Gangneung. If the circumstances are allowed, the city of Wonsan, North Korea will be involved, and could be the host of some alpine events.

Pyeongchang (mountain cluster)
The Alpensia Sports Park in Daegwallyeong-myeon, Pyeongchang, will be the main focus of the games, like in 2018.
 Yongpyong Dome - opening ceremony (co-hosted), closing ceremony (expected)
 Alpensia Ski Jumping Centre – ski jumping, Nordic combined, snowboarding 
 Alpensia Biathlon Centre – biathlon
 Alpensia Cross-Country Skiing Centre – cross-country skiing, Nordic combined
 Alpensia Sliding Centre – luge, bobsleigh, skeleton
 Yongpyong Alpine Centre – alpine skiing (slalom, giant slalom)

Additionally, a stand-alone outdoor sports venue was located in Bongpyeong-myeon, Pyeongchang:
 Phoenix Snow Park – freestyle skiing, snowboarding

Another stand-alone outdoor sports venue was located in neighboring Jeongseon county:
 High1 Resort – alpine skiing (downhill, super-G, combined)

Gangneung (coastal cluster)
The Gangneung Olympic Park, in the neighborhood of Gyo-dong in Gangneung city, includes four indoor sports venues, all in close proximity to one another.
 Gangneung Hockey Centre – ice hockey 
 Gangneung Curling Centre – curling
 Gangneung Oval – long track speed skating, opening ceremony (co-hosted)
 Gangneung Ice Arena – short track speed skating, figure skating

The Games

Sports
The Youth Olympic Games will feature 7 sports and 15 disciplines. 81 events, there will be no mixed team events (NOCs) for the first time, 34 men's events, and 34 women's events. A mixed-gender relay event in cross-country skiing that will replace two cross-country cross freestyle events, a mixed-gender team event in Nordic combined and two 1,500m individual events in short track speed skating will also be contested for the first time.

Marketing

Mascot
On January 19, 2023, the organizing committee revealed the mascot, named Moongcho. It was designed by college student Soo-Yeon Park. The mascot is in shape of a snowball that was born from a snow fight between Soohorang and Bandabi, the mascots of the 2018 Winter Olympics and Paralympics.

See also
 Winter sports:
 2018 Winter Olympics and 2018 Winter Paralympics in Pyeongchang, Gangwon, South Korea
 Summer sports:
 1988 Summer Olympics  and 1988 Summer Paralympics in Seoul, South Korea

References

External links
 
 

 
2024 in multi-sport events
2024
Olympic Games in South Korea
2024 in South Korean sport
Youth sport in South Korea
Multi-sport events in South Korea
Winter sports competitions in South Korea
South Korea at the Youth Olympics
2024 in youth sport
January 2024 sports events in Asia
February 2024 sports events in Asia
Winter Youth Olympics 2024
2024 in winter sports
International sports competitions hosted by South Korea